Vanclans is a former commune in the Doubs department in the Bourgogne-Franche-Comté region in eastern France.

Geography 
It is nestled between two hills at the foot of the first slopes of evergreens.

History 

Sir Guillaume de Cicon was from Cicon near Vanclans, the meagre remains of the family castle sit above Vanclans. Introduced to King Edwards service by Otto de Grandson. First mentioned 13 November 1276 when he comes to England with a message from Otto de Grandson to King Edward I of England. With the English army in South Wales in 1277. Constable of Rhuddlan Castle between February 1282 and May 1284 including the period of the Siege of Rhuddlan. First Constable of Conwy Castle from its construction until his death in 1310 or 1311.

On 1 January 2016, Athose, Chasnans, Hautepierre-le-Châtelet, Nods, Rantechaux and Vanclans merged becoming one commune called Les Premiers-Sapins.

Population

See also
 Communes of the Doubs department

References

External links

 Vanclans on the regional Web site 

Former communes of Doubs